Loubère is a French surname. It may refer to:

 Jean-Louis Loubère (1820–1893), French soldier, governor of French Guiana
 Simon de la Loubère  (1642–1729), French diplomat, writer, mathematician and poet